Kurani (also Romanized as Kūrānī; also known as Kūrāneh) is a village in Baranduzchay-ye Jonubi Rural District, in the Central District of Urmia County, West Azerbaijan Province, Iran. At the 2006 census, its population was 118, in 34 families.

References 

Populated places in Urmia County